Marian Măuţă (1 February 1976 – 24 November 2013) was a Romanian footballer, who primarily played as a midfielder.

Marian Măuţă died on 24 November 2013, aged 37, in his hometown of Bucharest, Romania.

References

1976 births
2013 deaths
Footballers from Bucharest
Romanian footballers
FC Sportul Studențesc București players
FC Brașov (1936) players
FC Bihor Oradea players
Association football midfielders